Springdell is an unincorporated community in West Marlborough Township in Chester County, Pennsylvania, United States. Springdell is located at the intersection of Pennsylvania Route 841 and Spring Dell Road.

References

Unincorporated communities in Chester County, Pennsylvania
Unincorporated communities in Pennsylvania